Robert Stanley Grosvenor Perry (4 May 1909 in Warwick – 3 April 1987 in Westminster) was a British sailor. He won a silver medal in the 5.5 metre class at the 1956 Summer Olympics.

References

External links
 

1909 births
1987 deaths
British male sailors (sport)
Olympic sailors of Great Britain
Olympic silver medallists for Great Britain
Olympic medalists in sailing
Sailors at the 1952 Summer Olympics – 5.5 Metre
Sailors at the 1956 Summer Olympics – 5.5 Metre
Medalists at the 1956 Summer Olympics